GoGrid was a cloud infrastructure service, hosting Linux and Windows virtual machines managed by a multi-server control panel and a RESTful API. In January 2015, Datapipe announced the acquisition of GoGrid.

Awards & recognitions
In July 2008, GoGrid was selected as a Finalist for LinuxWorld 2008 Product Excellence Award
by IDG World Expo and LinuxWorld.com.

In June 2010, GoGrid won “Best Channel Incentives” Award at 2010 ASCII Group Reseller Success Summit.

In March 2012, GoGrid selected as a winner of the Cloud-Infrastructure Category in OnDemand 2012, by AlwaysOn.

In 2011-2014, GoGrid appeared on the Gartner Cloud Infrastructure-as-a-Service (IaaS) Magic Quadrant.

See also 
 Cloud infrastructure
 Cloud computing

References

External links 
 Official site 

Cloud infrastructure
Cloud computing providers